The 2012 Suwon Samsung Bluewings season was Suwon Samsung Bluewings's seventeenth season in the K-League in South Korea. Suwon Samsung Bluewings is competing K-League and Korean FA Cup.

Current squad

Out on loan & military service

Transfer

In

Out

Coaching staff

Match results

K-League

All times are Korea Standard Time (KST) – UTC+9

League table

Results summary

Results by round

Korean FA Cup

Squad statistics

Appearances
{| class="wikitable" style="font-size: 95%; text-align: center;"
|-
!rowspan="2" valign="bottom"|No.
!rowspan="2" valign="bottom"|Nat.
!rowspan="2" valign="bottom"|Pos.
!rowspan="2" width="150"|Name
!colspan="2" width="80"|League
!colspan="2" width="80"|FA Cup
!colspan="2" width="120"|Appearances
!rowspan="2" width="40"|Goals
|-
!Apps
!Goals
!Apps
!Goals
!App (sub)
!Total
|-
|1||||GK||align="left"|Jung Sung-Ryong
|19||0||2||0||21 (0)||21||0
|-
|2||||DF||align="left"|Choi Jae-Soo
|2||0||0||0||2 (0)||2||0
|-
|3||||DF||align="left"|Yang Sang-Min
|14 (1)||1||2||0||16 (1)||17||1
|-
|4||||DF||align="left"|Kwak Kwang-Seon
|18 (1)||0||2||0||20 (1)||21||0
|-
|5||||MF||align="left"|Park Hyun-Beom
|21||3||2||1||23 (0)||23||4
|-
|6||||MF||align="left"|Lee Yong-Rae
|21||2||2||0||23 (0)||23||2
|-
|7||||FW||align="left"|Cho Dong-Geon
|3 (5)||0||0||0||3 (5)||8||0
|-
|8||||MF||align="left"|Lee Sang-ho
|2 (1)||0||0||0||2 (1)||3||0
|-
|9||||MF||align="left"|Oh Jang-Eun
|8 (1)||0||0 (2)||0||8 (3)||11||0
|-
|10||||FW||align="left"|Dženan Radončić
|14 (3)||7||2||1||16 (3)||19||8
|-
|11||||FW||align="left"|Stevica Ristić
|15 (2)||6||2||3||17 (2)||19||9
|-
|12||||FW||align="left"|Lee Hyun-Jin
|0 (6)||0||0||0||0 (6)||6||0
|-
|13||||MF||align="left"|Seo Jung-Jin
|19 (3)||1||2||0||21 (3)||24||1
|-
|14||||DF||align="left"|Oh Beom-Seok
|20||0||2||0||22 (0)||22||0
|-
|15||||MF||align="left"|Hong Soon-Hak
|4 (2)||0||0||0||4 (2)||6||0
|-
|16||||MF||align="left"|Cho Ji-Hun
|0 (2)||0||0||0||0 (2)||2||0
|-
|17||||MF||align="left"|Park Tae-Woong
|0 (0)||0||0||0||0 (0)||0||0
|-
|18||||MF||align="left"|Park Jong-Jin
|6 (7)||1||0 (1)||0||6 (8)||14||1
|-
|19||||FW||align="left"|Cho Yong-Tae
|2 (10)||1||1||1||3 (10)||13||2
|-
|21||||GK||align="left"|Yang Dong-Won
|4||0||0||0||4 (0)||4||0
|-
|22||||FW||align="left"|Éverton
|19 (1)||7||0||0||19 (1)||20||7
|-
|23||||DF||align="left"|Eddy Bosnar
|19 (1)||1||2||0||21 (1)||22||1
|-
|24||||FW||align="left"|Han Dong-Won
|0||0||0||0||0||0||0
|-
|25||||DF||align="left"|Choi Sung-Hwan
|0||0||0||0||0||0||0
|-
|27||||MF||align="left"|Im Kyung-Hyun
|0 (1)||0||0||0||0 (1)||1||0
|-
|28||||FW||align="left"|Ha Tae-Goon
|5 (14)||3||0 (2)||0||5 (16)||21||3
|-
|29||||DF||align="left"|Kwak Hee-Ju
|13 (4)||0||0 (1)||0||13 (5)||18||0
|-
|30||||MF||align="left"|Shin Se-Gye
|5 (2)||0||0||0||5 (2)||7||0
|-
|31||||GK||align="left"|Kwon Tae-Ahn
|0||0||0||0||0||0||0
|-
|32||||MF||align="left"|Park Yong-Jae
|0||0||0||0||0||0||0
|-
|33||||FW||align="left"|Lee Je-Kyu
|0||0||0||0||0||0||0
|-
|34||||MF||align="left"|Lee Jin-Woo
|0||0||0||0||0||0||0
|-
|35||||MF||align="left"|Ahn Young-Gyu
|0||0||0||0||0||0||0
|-
|36||||FW||align="left"|Choi Nag-Min
|0||0||0||0||0||0||0
|-
|37||||FW||align="left"|Jeon Gun-Jong
|0||0||0||0||0||0||0
|-
|39||||DF||align="left"|Min Sang-Gi
|0 (2)||0||0||0||0 (2)||2||0
|-
|40||||DF||align="left"|Kim Kwan-Chul
|0||0||0||0||0||0||0
|-
|41||||DF||align="left"|Kim Jae-Hwan
|0||0||0||0||0||0||0
|-
|42||||DF||align="left"|Park Joon-Seoung
|0||0||0||0||0||0||0
|-
|43||||DF||align="left"|Noh Hyung-Goo
|0||0||0||0||0||0||0
|-
|45||||DF||align="left"|Lee Kyung-Soon
|0||0||0||0||0||0||0
|-
|98||||DF||align="left"|Kim Dae-Hwan
|0||0||0||0||0||0||0

Goals and assists
{| class="wikitable" style="font-size: 95%; text-align: center;"
|-
!rowspan=2 width=60|Rank
!rowspan=2 width=60|Nation
!rowspan=2 width=60|Number
!rowspan=2 width=150|Name
!colspan=2 width=100|K-League
!colspan=2 width=100|KFA Cup
!colspan=2 width=100|Sum
!rowspan=2 width=80|Total
|-
!width=50|Goals
!width=50|Assists
!width=50|Goals
!width=50|Assists
!width=50|Goals
!width=50|Assists
|-
|1
|
|11
|Stevica Ristić
|6||2||3||0||9||2||11
|-
|=
|
|22
|Éverton
|7||4||0||0||7||4||11
|-
|2
|
|10
|Dženan Radončić
|7||2||1||0||8||2||10
|-
|3
|
|6
|Lee Yong-Rae
|2||2||0||2||2||4||6
|-
|4
|
|13
|Seo Jung-Jin
|1||3||0||1||1||4||5
|-
|5
|
|5
|Park Hyun-Beom
|3||0||1||0||4||0||4
|-
|6
|
|28
|Ha Tae-Goon
|3||0||0||0||3||0||3
|-
|=
|
|19
|Cho Yong-Tae
|1||1||1||0||2||1||3
|-
|=
|
|3
|Yang Sang-Min
|1||1||0||1||1||2||3
|-
|=
|
|18
|Park Jong-Jin
|1||2||0||0||1||2||3
|-
|7
|
|7
|Cho Dong-Geon
|0||2||0||0||0||2||2
|-
|8
|
|23
|Eddy Bosnar
|1||0||0||0||1||0||1
|-
|=
|
|14
|Oh Beom-Seok
|0||1||0||0||0||1||1
|-
|=
|
|29
|Kwak Hee-Ju
|0||1||0||0||0||1||1
|-
|/||/||/||Own Goals
|2||-||1||-||3||-||3
|-
!/!!/!!/!!TOTALS
!35!!21!!7!!4!!42!!25!!67

Discipline
{| class="wikitable" style="font-size: 95%; text-align: center;"
|-
| rowspan="2" width="60" align="center"|Position
| rowspan="2" width="60" align="center"|Nation
| rowspan="2" width="60" align="center"|Number
| rowspan="2" width="150" align="center"|Name
|colspan="2" width="100" align="center"|K-League
|colspan="2" width="100" align="center"|KFA Cup
|colspan="2" width="100" align="center"|Total
|-
!width="50" style="background: #FFEE99"|
!width="50" style="background: #FF8888"|
!width="50" style="background: #FFEE99"|
!width="50" style="background: #FF8888"|
!width="50" style="background: #FFEE99"|
!width="50" style="background: #FF8888"|
|-
|DF
|
|3
|Yang Sang-Min
|4||0||0||0||4||0
|-
|DF
|
|4
|Kwak Kwang-Seon
|6||0||0||0||6||0
|-
|MF
|
|5
|Park Hyun-Beom
|3||0||1||0||4||0
|-
|MF
|
|6
|Lee Yong-Rae
|4||0||0||0||4||0
|-
|FW
|
|7
|Cho Dong-Geon
|1||0||0||0||1||0
|-
|FW
|
|10
|Dženan Radončić
|2||0||0||0||2||0
|-
|FW
|
|11
|Stevica Ristić
|3||0||1||0||4||0
|-
|MF
|
|13
|Seo Jung-Jin
|5||0||0||0||5||0
|-
|DF
|
|14
|Oh Beom-Seok
|7||0||1||0||8||0
|-
|MF
|
|15
|Hong Soon-Hak
|1||0||0||0||1||0
|-
|FW
|
|22
|Éverton
|5||0||0||0||5||0
|-
|DF
|
|23
|Eddy Bosnar
|2||0||0||0||2||0
|-
|MF
|
|27
|Im Kyung-Hyun
|1||0||0||0||1||0
|-
|DF
|
|29
|Kwak Hee-Ju
|4||0||0||0||4||0
|-
|MF
|
|30
|Shin Se-Gye
|2||0||0||0||2||0
|-
! colspan=4 | TOTAL  
! 50 !! 0 !! 3 !! 0 !! 53 !! 0

Honours

Individual
K-League Best Goal:  Bosnar

References

Suwon Samsung Bluewings seasons
Suwon Samsung Bluewings